Fageol Motors was a United States manufacturer of buses, trucks and farm tractors.

History

The company was founded in 1916, in Oakland, California, by Rollie, William, Frank and Claude Fageol, to manufacture motor trucks, farm tractors and automobiles. It was located next to Oakland Assembly, then a Chevrolet factory originally built in 1917 by William Durant, which later became part of General Motors.

Fageol produced two luxury automobiles, but production was halted when the supply of Hall-Scott SOHC six-cylinder engines was diverted to build airplanes for the war in World War I.

The first Fageol farm tractor was a re-labeled Hamilton Walking Tractor, designed and built by Rush E. Hamilton of Geyserville, California. As a result of the many tractor performance trials of the day, the tractor was redesigned to be more compatible with the needs of the West Coast. The Fageol version was designed by a team led by Horatio Smith with the cooperation of Hamilton. In about 1923, the tractor business was sold to the Great Western Motors Company of San Jose, with Hamilton and Smith joining Great Western.

In 1921, Fageol became the first company to build a bus from the ground up. The new-style bus was initially called "Safety Bus", and the goal was to build a bus that was resistant to overturning when cornering. It had a wide track, and was lower to the ground for ease of entry and exit. Following their successful introduction, the vehicles were renamed "Safety Coaches", a term intended to imply greater value.

Fageol trucks became favorites of the industry owing, in part, to the dual range, mid-mounted transmission. That gearbox allowed for extreme ranges in gearing, ranging from slow-speed heavy hauling to highway speeds with lighter loads. The vehicles were easily spotted, due to the large number "7" painted on the front of the radiator.

The Fageol brothers left the company in 1927 to form the Twin Coach Company, manufacturing buses in Kent, Ohio. Leadership of the business was taken over by company president L.H. Bill, but during the Great Depression the company went into receivership. The bank assumed control and reorganized the company under the name Fageol Truck and Coach. In 1938, T. A. Peterman bought the factory and its contents. In 1939, the first Peterbilt was produced.

The South Australian Railways (SAR) operated a number of Fageol buses. In 1932, that system introduced the first of four railcars, converted from road buses at Islington Railway Workshops. The vehicles initially operated on the SAR  gauge Eyre Peninsula Railway, but some were transferred to the Kingston to Naracoorte line, prior to the line's conversion to  broad gauge. Because the buses were not designed for rail use, the ride was very rough. The last Fageol railcar was condemned in 1961.

Products

Fageol produced tractors, buses and trucks, at least three luxury cars, as well as engines for land vehicles and ships. The company went through several stages, names, and location changes that included Fageol Motors Company, from 1915 to 1932 in Oakland, California; Fageol Motor Sales Company, from 1916 to 1932 in Oakland, California; Fageol Truck and Coach Company, from 1932 to 1938 in Oakland, California; Fageol Motors Company of Ohio, from 1920 to 1922 in Cleveland, Ohio and 1922 to 1926 in Kent, Ohio.

Tractors
The brothers had originally sold the Hamilton Walking Tractor, rebranded as the Fageol Walking Tractor, without much success. They were contracted to solve a transportation issue at the 1915 Panama Pacific Exposition. The fair covered over 600 acres, with two and a half miles of water front property. From February to December over 18 million people visited the fair. The solution provided by the brothers ended up being the Fageol Auto Train, also called the Trackless Train, powered with a Ford motor, pulling two or three low to the ground 20 passenger open-sided cars. The financial backer chose to use a different spelling, for ease of pronunciation, so the company was registered as The Fadgl Auto Train Inc.

This led to the founding of the Fageol Motors Company of Oakland. The company reached an agreement with Rush Hamilton of Geyserville, California to manufacture a tractor with spiked rear wheels.

Trucks
In 1950, the company manufactured a unique truck, the TC CargoLiner – touted as "A Trailer Without A Tractor". In 1953 the Twin Coach Company was awarded a patent for what would become the standard in straight truck design. The inventor was Louis J Fageol. The company produced 1 1/2 ton, 2 1/2 ton, 3 1/2-4 ton, and 5-6 ton trucks.

Cars
Since the founding of Fageol Motors Company, there had been a plan to build automobiles. Frank R. and William B. Fageol, with Louis H. Bill, built and marketed what was to be the most expensive luxury car of the time using the Hall-Scott aircraft engine. Marketed as the "Fageol Four Passenger Touring Speedster", only three were known to have been produced before the government took over the engine manufacturing plant to build war planes, ending production. Other cars built by the company were:

Fageol 100
 Fageol Supersonic 
 PataRay, also known as Fageol Special

Buses
Fageol produced buses until 1953, when the bus-manufacturing portion of the Fageol Twin Coach Company was absorbed by Flxible.

Twin Coach 44S co-manufactured with JG Brill Company and Twin Coach
 Safety Coach
 Cruising coach dubbed "America"
 Canopy covered double-decker "Sight-Seeing" buss
 Fageol Flyer
 Parlor Car
 Rear double-decker Parlor Car
 Super Twin (introduced in 1938) was a 14-ton 58-passenger diesel-electric that was hinged in the middle.

References

External links

 Oakland History Room, photo collection. Fageol Motors. Groundbreaking ceremony at Foothill Blvd and 106th, Oakland, California, June 9, 1917
 Oakland History Room, photo collection. Fageol Motors. First unit under construction in Oakland
 Oakland History Room, photo collection. Fageol Motors. Another view of the factory under construction, with a Fageol truck in the foreground
 Oakland History Room, photo collection. Fageol Motors. Second unit under construction
 Oakland History Room, photo collection. Hall-Scott Motor Company. 150 horsepower straight-6 engines being assembled were formerly destined for Fageol products
Fageol.com

Defunct bus manufacturers of the United States
History of Oakland, California
Vehicle manufacturing companies established in 1916
Manufacturing companies based in Oakland, California
Motor vehicle manufacturers based in California
Defunct truck manufacturers of the United States
1916 establishments in California
Defunct manufacturing companies based in California